Crocodile is a 1996 South Korean film. Released on November 16, it was the directorial debut of Kim Ki-duk and stars Cho Jae-hyun as the titular character.

The film tells the story of a man living at the edge of the Han River in Seoul who saves a woman trying to commit suicide. He then proceeds to rape and abuse her until an odd relationship develops between them.

References

External links 
 
 

1996 films
1996 drama films
Films directed by Kim Ki-duk
South Korean independent films
1990s Korean-language films
South Korean drama films
1996 directorial debut films
1996 independent films